Somitsyno is a rural locality (a village) in Nizhne-Vazhskoye Rural Settlement, Verkhovazhsky District, Vologda Oblast, Russia. The population was 28 as of 2002. There are 3 streets.

Geography 
Somitsyno is located 3 km northeast of Verkhovazhye (the district's administrative centre) by road. Cheryomushki is the nearest rural locality.

References 

Rural localities in Verkhovazhsky District